A special election was held in  in 1816 to fill a vacancy left by the resignation of Alexander C. Hanson (F) upon being elected to the United States Senate.

Election results

George Peter was seated on December 2, 1816.

See also
List of special elections to the United States House of Representatives

References

Maryland 1816 03
Maryland 1816 03
1816 03
Maryland 03
United States House of Representatives 03
United States House of Representatives 1816 03